Macaranga gigantea is a pioneer tree species from western Indo-China and Malesia including Sulawesi.

References

Further reading

External links

https://web.archive.org/web/20120212113214/http://www.nationaalherbarium.nl/MacMalBorneo/Macaranga%20gigantea.htm

gigantea
Taxa named by Heinrich Zollinger
Taxa named by Heinrich Gustav Reichenbach
Taxa named by Johannes Müller Argoviensis